Alexander Bryan (born 12 May 1994) is a Turks and Caicos Islander footballer who plays as a defender for AFC Academy and the Turks and Caicos Islands national football team.

Bryan is the son of former Turks and Caicos Islands national football team player Christopher Bryan.

Career

International
Bryan made his senior international debut on 23 March 2015 in a 6-2 defeat to Saint Kitts and Nevis during World Cup Qualifying.

References

External links

Profile at EuroSport

1994 births
Living people
Turks and Caicos Islands footballers
Turks and Caicos Islands international footballers
Association football defenders
AFC Academy players